Buxolestes is an extinct genus of semi-aquatic, non-placental eutherian mammals belonging to the family Pantolestidae. Species in this genus were part of the first placental evolutionary radiation during the Middle Eocene (48-40 mya) and found in the Bracklesham Group and Wittering Formation of England, at the Messel Pit in Germany and in Bouxwiller, France.

Description 
They were significantly smaller than most living species of otters. Fossilized stomach contents confirm their semiaquatic freshwater habits. The anatomy of these archaic "insectivorous" mammals is known through well-preserved Middle Eocene specimens found at Messel in Germany. Their structure evidences a clear adaptation to a semiaquatic way of life. The forelimbs and hindlimbs are powerful and show strong claws. The tail is clearly fit for swimming. The skull is long, with large molars that appear to be adapted to a diet of molluscs with shells (freshwater clams and freshwater snails), but the predilection postulated from the dentition has not been confirmed.

Species 
 Buxolestes minor  Pfretzschner 1999
 Buxolestes piscator  Koenigswald 1980

References

External links 
The Paleobiology Database
Global Names
Paleocene mammals
Pantolestidae

Cimolestans
Lutetian life
Eocene mammals of Europe
Paleogene England
Fossils of England
Paleogene France
Fossils of France
Paleogene Germany
Fossils of Germany
Fossil taxa described in 1970
Prehistoric mammal genera